Fylkisvöllur is a multi-use stadium in Reykjavík, Iceland.  It is currently used mostly for football matches.  The stadium holds roughly 1800 spectators seated. 
The name for the stadium was changed to Flórídana völlurinn in 2015 and Würth völlurinn in 2019 due to sponsorship reasons

References

External links
 Fylkisvöllur - Nordic Stadiums

Football venues in Iceland
Sports venues in Reykjavík